RFA Sir Galahad (L3005) was a landing ship logistics (LSL) of the Royal Fleet Auxiliary, later in service with the Brazilian Navy as the Garcia D'Avila.

Construction and design
Sir Galahad was ordered on 6 September 1984 to a design by the shipbuilder Swan Hunter, as a replacement for the landing ship of the same name that had been sunk in the 1982 Falklands War. The ship was laid down at Swan Hunter's Wallsend shipyard on 12 July 1985, was launched on 13 December 1986 and completed on 19 July 1987, entering service on 7 December that year.

Displacement was  light and  full load.

Service
RFA Sir Galahad was built by Swan Hunter and entered service in 1988. She was named and given the identical pennant number to the Sir Galahad sunk in the Falklands War. Built as a combined landing craft and ferry with two flight decks for helicopters and bow and stern doors, there was capacity for around 400 troops and 3,440 tonnes of supplies.

She was deployed in 1991 for Operation Granby, 1995 in Angola Operation Chantress and in 2003 for Operation Telic to transport supplies. In 2003 Sir Galahad transported humanitarian aid, docking in Umm Qasr Port on 28 March 2003, after being delayed while naval mines were cleared.

On 26 April 2007, it was announced that she was to be purchased by Brazil. On 20 July 2006, the ship sailed from Marchwood to Portsmouth, to be decommissioned.

She was commissioned into the Brazilian Navy as Navio de Desembarque de Carros de Combate (NDCC) "Garcia D'Avila" on 4 December 2007.

In Brazilian service, she was responsible for transporting vehicles and supplies to Port-au-Prince in support of United Nations peacekeepers deployed in Haiti during MINUSTAH.

In June 2019 it was announced than the ship will be decommissioned on 29 October 2019.

Gallery

References

Galahad (1987)
Ships built on the River Tyne
1986 ships
Round Table-class landing ships logistics of the Brazilian Navy
Ships built by Swan Hunter